"Something About the Night" is a song recorded by American singer K. Michelle that appears on her second studio album Anybody Wanna Buy a Heart? (2014). The song was released on December 3, 2014 as the third single from the album. It was written by Kimberly Michelle Pate and Bianca Atterberry. Its music and production was done by Oak Felder, Ronald "Flippa" Colson, and Steve Ace. "Something About the Night" is a midtempo soul song that according to music critics has influences from various genres. The song's lyrics are about Michelle's love for partying and drinking.

Critical response to "Something About the Night" was primarily positive; critics pointing to it as a highlight of the album. A music video in which Michelle performs in a 1920s speakeasy was released on December 9, 2014. The singer's performance was influenced by American singer Billie Holiday. Critics responded positively to the video and praised Michelle's acting.

Background and composition 
"Something About the Night" was written by Kimberly Michelle Pate and Bianca Atterberry, and its music and produced was done by Oak Felder, Ronald "Flippa" Colson, and Steve Ace. Donnie Meadows and Tanisha Broadwater helped to coordinate the track's production, while Kevin "Batos" Guardado worked as an assistant producer. Michelle's vocals were produced by Atterberry, and recorded by C Travis Kr8ts with additional assistance from Felder. The track was mixed by Jaycen Joshua, with assistance from Maddox Chhim and Ryan Kaul, and it was mastered by David Kutch. In 2014, "Something About the Night" was released as the third single from Michelle's second studio album Anybody Wanna Buy a Heart? (2014), which followed her previous releases "Love 'Em All" and "Maybe I Should Call".

"Something About the Night" is a midtempo soul song that lasts three minutes and 30 seconds. Describing the single as an example of alternative soul, Sarah Godfrey of The Washington Post wrote that its composition was similar to the music of American musician Norman Connors. Various writers for Rolling Stone interpreted the track as "synth-funk erotica" and representative of the multiple genres on the album. A contributor for the Star Tribune wrote that "Something About the Night" is a "theatrical, space-soul" track" and that Michelle showcases "a hilarious cattiness in [her] character" that is reminiscent of her personality on the reality television shows Love & Hip Hop and K. Michelle: My Life. The song's lyrics are about Michelle's love for partying and drinking, and include lines such as "don't give a fuck".

Critical reception 
Upon its release, "Something About the Night" received mostly positive feedback from music critics. Andy Kellman of AllMusic selected the single as a highlight from Anybody Wanna Buy a Heart? for its "gently grinding verses and a floating chorus laid out prior to a switch-up that evokes a blissful liftoff". Godfrey praised Michelle's vocals in the song, and Elias Leight and Steven J. Horowitz of Billboard identified it as a standout track from the album. Mike Wass of Idolator commended "Something About the Night" as part of "a batch of killer soul anthems", alongside "Maybe I Should Call". In a mixed review, PopMatters''' Devone Jones responded positively to the use of nostalgia in the song but criticized its production and chorus as unmemorable.

 Music video 

The music video for "Something About the Night", directed by Child Basquiat, was released on December 9, 2014; the same day as the album. In the six-minute video, Michelle emulates American singer Billie Holiday in a 1920s speakeasy. A writer from Singersroom interpreted the video's storyline about Michelle's struggles with alcoholism, oppressive men, and her rising career as inspiration from Holiday. Throughout the video, Michelle is seen wearing "figure-hugging flapper fashions".

The video opens with Michelle preparing for a performance while drinking an excessive quantity of alcoholic drinks. While dancing provocatively, she sings with a drummer, a standup bassist, and background vocalists. During the performance, Michelle looks seductively at a man in the audience who later scolds her for drinking brown liquor. The singer is also shown fighting a man for a bottle of whiskey. After the show, Michelle argues with her manager about money before collapsing on the floor and screaming, “I’m the star! They came to see me. This is my show!”. Michelle eventually leaves the club with the manager, whose motive is revealed as a financially exploitative one. Emily Tan of The Boombox believed the story would continue in a future music video.

Critical reception of the music video was positive. Tan and a writer for Rap-Up praised Michelle's acting in the video. Mike Wass referred to the video as "glamorous and extravagant".

 Credits and personnel 
Credits were adapted from the liner notes from Anybody Wanna Buy A Heart?'':

 Donnie Meadows – production coordination
 Tanisha Broadwater – production coordination
 Kimberly Pate – lyricist
 Bianca Atterberry – lyricist, vocal production
 Warren "Oak" Felder – production, music, additional recording
 Ronald "Flippa" Colson – production, music
 Steve Ace – production, music

 Kevin "Batos" Guardado – production assistant
 C Travis Kr8ts – recording
 Jaycen Joshua – mixing
 Maddox Chhim – mixing assistantance
 Ryan Kaul – mixing assistantance
 David Kutch – mastering

Notes

References

External links
 

2014 singles
2014 songs
Atlantic Records singles
K. Michelle songs
Songs written by K. Michelle
Songs written by Bianca Atterberry
Songs written by Oak Felder